William James Adams Jr. (born March 15, 1975), known professionally as will.i.am (pronounced "Will-I-am"), is an American rapper, singer, songwriter, actor, and record producer. He rose to prominence as the founder and lead member of the Black Eyed Peas.

As a solo artist, will.i.am has released four albums, beginning with Lost Change (2001), through Atlantic Records. His second solo outing, Must B 21, was released on September 23, 2003. The track "Go!" was regularly used as the theme for the NBA Live 2005 and Madden NFL 2005 seasons. The third album, Songs About Girls, was released on September 25, 2007. He released his fourth studio album, #willpower, in 2013.

As a music producer, will.i.am has worked for other artists including A.R. Rahman, Cheryl, Michael Jackson, Justin Bieber, Kesha, Britney Spears, Miley Cyrus, David Guetta, U2, Rihanna, Lady Gaga, Usher, Justin Timberlake, Nicki Minaj, 2NE1, and Baby Kaely. In collaborations and with the Black Eyed Peas, he has a total of 41 top-40 entries on the UK Singles Chart since 1998, and has sold 9.4 million singles in the UK.

In addition to his music career, will.i.am has also been a judge and mentor on the television talent show series The Voice UK (2012–present), The Voice Australia (2014), and The Voice Kids (2017–present). He is the recipient of a Latin Grammy Award, a Daytime Emmy Award, and seven Grammy Awards.

Early life
William James Adams Jr. was born in Los Angeles on March 15, 1975, the son of American mother Debra (née Cain) and Jamaican father William Adams Sr. He has never met his father, and was raised by his mother in the Estrada Courts housing projects in the Boyle Heights neighborhood of Los Angeles, where they were among the few African-Americans living in a predominantly Hispanic community. He did not discover his full birth name until he was 25. His mother encouraged him to be unique and to avoid conforming to the tendencies of the other youths in the neighborhood. To guide his musical career, she sent him to public schools in the more affluent West Los Angeles area such as Paul Revere Charter Middle School, which was one hour-long bus journey away. During the regular school year, he attended Palisades Charter High School. During that time, he started going to raves with classmate Pasquale Rotella.

Adams' maternal uncle is former NFL player Lynn Cain, who inspired him during his early years. While studying at summer school at John Marshall High School, Adams became best friends with Allan Pineda (better known as apl.de.ap), who would later become a member of the Black Eyed Peas. While still in high school, Adams and Pineda performed in East Los Angeles clubs and were soon joined by three others to form the socially conscious Atban Klann rap group. Atban Klann caught the attention of rapper Eazy-E and Mason Miller, signing to his record label Ruthless Records in 1992. Adams later said his history with rave culture is why he chose a more electro sound for the Black Eyed Peas' albums The E.N.D. and The Beginning. Despite the use of electro and house music elements, will.i.am prefers to separate the underground from pop; in an article with Los Angeles Times, he mentioned that the secrecy surrounding the whereabouts of raves is what made raving special and different from the mainstream.

Music career

1988–2000: Formations and the Black Eyed Peas

In the summer of 1988, will.i.am began his music career as an eighth-grader when he met up with rapper Allan Pineda (better known as apl.de.ap) and fellow student Dante Santiago. They began performing together around Los Angeles and were soon discovered by rapper/entrepreneur Eazy-E, who signed them to his label Ruthless Records in 1992. At the time, Will was known as “Will 1X” Atban Klann's first ever official track, "Merry Muthafuckin' Xmas", was included on Eazy-E's EP 5150: Home 4 tha Sick. After this, the trio began recording an album, "Grass Roots", with the help of producers Mookie Mook and DJ Motiv8, but the album was never released due to Eazy-E's tragic death in 1995. Subsequently, they changed their name to Black Eyed Pods, and Will replaced Dante with Jaime Gomez, better known under his stage name of Taboo. In 1997, they once again changed their name, this time to the Black Eyed Peas, and began recording their first album, Behind the Front, with the help of soul singer Kim Hill. They were soon signed to Interscope Records, and released their debut single, "Joints & Jam", in early 1998. The album was successful enough for the group's contract to be renewed, and in 2000, a second album, Bridging the Gap, was released.

2000–2003: Lost Change, Elephunk and Must B 21
Following the release of Bridging the Gap, Will began recording his first solo release, Lost Change, which was the official soundtrack to the film of the same name. Featuring collaborations with Medusa, Planet Asia and Terry Dexter, the album was a critical success.

In November 2001, work began on a third Black Eyed Peas album, Elephunk. Development of the album began on November 2, 2001, and was released just under two years later in 2003. At the time of development, only will.i.am, apl.de.ap and Taboo were to feature on the album. During the production of "Shut Up" (the second single released from the album), they realized that a female vocal would work well with the song. Originally, Nicole Scherzinger (lead singer of the Pussycat Dolls) was approached to make a guest appearance on the record. She was forced to decline because she already was signed to a contract with Eden's Crush. Danté Santiago then introduced Fergie to will.i.am, whom she impressed with her vocal talents. She immediately bonded with the band and became a permanent member of the Peas, and her photo was printed onto the album cover. Lyricist Robbie Fisher, who has been working closely with the band since the beginning stages of the album, composed nine out of the fourteen tracks. In the United States, Elephunk reached number 14 on the Billboard Top 200 and is their first album to chart in the top 15. It gained even more commercial success internationally, particularly in the UK Album Charts where it reached number 3. It has sold over 1.6 million copies in the UK and 8.5 million copies worldwide. The singles "Where Is the Love?" and "Shut Up" reached number 1. "Hey Mama" has been used for several advertisements including advertisements for Apple and iTunes. "Let's Get It Started" also received universal acclaim in the media section where a cover version of the song appears in the film Hot Tub Time Machine. After the success of Elephunk, the Peas were approached by EA games to feature some of their music on the 2004 game The Urbz. They remixed some of the tracks on Elephunk and translated it into Simlish and created new tracks for the game. They also feature in the game as playable characters.

The group released their breakthrough single, "Where Is the Love?", in November 2002 (featuring Justin Timberlake, although he did not appear in the video). On the strength of that single and follow-up singles like "Shut Up", Elephunk went on to sell 8.5 million copies worldwide. During this time, Will recorded a second solo album, Must B 21. In 2002, Will recorded the song "Secrets" for the soundtrack to Dexter's Laboratory: The Hip-Hop Experiment, a musical accompaniment to the Cartoon Network original series. Prior to this, he had also composed the theme music for another Genndy Tartakovsky series, Samurai Jack.

2003–2006: Monkey Business
In November 2003, work began on a fourth Black Eyed Peas album, entitled Monkey Business, the second album with new band member Fergie. Upon the success of Monkey Business, which was released in 2005, the album was certified three times Platinum by the RIAA in the U.S. and has sold over 10 million copies worldwide. The Canadian Recording Industry Association (or CRIA) has certified Monkey Business 6× Platinum, with sales of over 600,000 copies. The Australian Recording Industry Association (or ARIA) has also certified Monkey Business 6× Platinum, denoting sales of over 420,000 copies. The album's tracks earned the group four 2006 Grammy Award nominations and they also won the Grammy for Best Rap Performance by a Duo or Group for "Don't Phunk with My Heart". According to IFPI, over 2 million copies have been sold in Europe. In the UK alone, it has sold over 1 million copies, although this is significantly lower than their sales of Elephunk, which stand at over 1.6 million copies and 10 million worldwide.
The band announced they were going to take a break to focus on their own personal projects. Will went on to produce Fergie's first solo album, The Dutchess, which was released in 2006, before beginning work with Michael Jackson, who had requested Will's expertise for the recording and production of his new album. Work began on the Jackson album in 2006, and continued until the singer's death in 2009, at which point will.i.am revealed that none of the material recorded during the period would be released. However, remixes recorded for Jackson's Thriller 25 anniversary album were released in 2008.

2007–2009: Songs About Girls and Change Is Now

In 2007, will.i.am announced that he had co-created an all-female soul band entitled the Paradiso Girls, who he intended to work with on an upcoming solo project. The album, Songs About Girls, was released in 2007. The album spawned three singles, "I Got It From My Mama", "One More Chance" and "Heartbreaker", and fared slightly better than his previous solo efforts, however, failed to shift more than 75,000 copies. Will also did a remix to the song "With Love" by actress and singer Hilary Duff.

In 2008, will.i.am contributed the song "One Tribe" to the Survival International charity album, Songs for Survival. Also in 2008, he was featured on rapper Flo Rida's debut album, Mail on Sunday, where he produced and featured on the song "In the Ayer", and featured on Usher's fifth album, Here I Stand. In January 2008, will.i.am announced plans that he was masterminding a political album, Change is Now: Renewing America's Promise, in support of Barack Obama's presidential campaign. The first single, "Yes We Can", featured a music video directed by Jesse Dylan. The lyrics of the song are composed almost entirely of excerpts from Obama's speech on January 8, 2008, following the New Hampshire presidential primary election. The video features appearances from numerous celebrities and first appeared on the website for Dipdive. The video racked up three million views within a week and over four million subsequently on YouTube. On June 13, 2008, "Yes We Can" won an award at the 35th Annual Creative Arts and Entertainment Daytime Emmy Awards for "New Approaches in Daytime Entertainment". On February 29, 2008, the album's second single, "We Are the Ones", was released on Dipdive and YouTube. The video features several celebrities chanting "O-BA-MA" as a portrayal as their hopes and wishes for Obama and his presidential campaign. On November 4, 2008, will.i.am spoke to CNN's Anderson Cooper about his support for then-Senator Obama using CNN's 'hologram' technology (actually tomography). Following the 2008 election, and Obama's victory, Will released the album's third single, "It's a New Day". The video reflects on the historical events that led to the election of the first African-American president and the public's reaction to his election. The video debuted on The Oprah Winfrey Show. In honor of the inauguration of Barack Obama as president, will.i.am collaborated with producer David Foster on the album's fourth single, "America's Song", with contributing vocals from Seal, Bono, Mary J. Blige, and Faith Hill. In response to Obama's reaction following Kanye West's interruption of Taylor Swift at the 2009 MTV Video Music Awards, will.i.am penned the album's fifth and final single, "The Jackass Song". It featured a sample of Kanye West's "Heartless". Will wrote a blog post, which featured the song on Dipdive, and released in February 2009. will.i.am attended and spoke at the FIRST Robotics Competition kickoff on January 8, 2011, declaring, "I am a FIRST fan." He has also named FIRST Founder Dean Kamen "one of [his] heroes" on his verified Twitter account.

2009–2016: Black Eyed Peas reformation, The E.N.D, The Beginning, and #willpower
In March 2009, will.i.am announced plans for the Black Eyed Peas to return, and within months their comeback single, "Boom Boom Pow", had reached number 1 on the UK Singles Chart and Billboard Hot 100. They went on to have three number 1 singles before releasing their comeback album, The E.N.D. The album's success warranted a second comeback album, The Beginning, released in November 2010. The album spawned another three hit singles, but the band soon announced plans they were to break again, following the conclusion of their world tour. In 2009, will.i.am worked with rappers Flo Rida and Akon for Flo's second studio album, R.O.O.T.S., and recorded four tracks with Girls Aloud member Cheryl for her debut solo album 3 Words. He also worked with Rihanna on her fourth studio album, Rated R, for a track called "Photographs". In February 2010, he wrote and produced the single "OMG" by Usher, which appeared on Usher's seventh studio album, Raymond vs. Raymond. In a YouTube video posted by YGLifeOfficial on March 15, 2010, will.i.am expressed his desire to work with Korean K-pop girl group 2NE1, and help them achieve international success. Will has recorded a collaboration with Britney Spears, "Big Fat Bass", which features on her seventh studio album, Femme Fatale.

During the recording of the Black Eyed Peas' sixth studio album, The Beginning, band colleague Fergie announced in an interview that will.i.am was in the process of recording a new solo album, tentatively entitled Black Einstein. will.i.am formally announced that he was in the process of recording a fourth solo album, with some material being recorded under the pseudonym Zuper Blahq. In January 2010, a cut from the album, "I'm In the House", a collaboration with Steve Aoki, was released as a single, charting at #29 on the UK Singles Chart due to strong downloads. In October 2010, a second cut from the album, "Check It Out", a collaboration with rapper Nicki Minaj, peaked at #4 on the UK Singles Chart. In February 2011, a third cut from the album, "Dance", a collaboration with Natalia Kills, peaked at #62 on the UK Singles Chart. The music video was directed by James Sutton, and features a cameo by Natalia. In April 2011, will.i.am recorded four songs for the soundtrack of the animated film Rio, in which he voiced the character, Pedro the red-crested cardinal. "Hot Wings (I Wanna Party)", "Drop It Low", "Real In Rio" and "Advice For The Young At Heart", featuring an array of artists including Jamie Foxx, Anne Hathaway and Tears for Fears. None of the songs managed to chart, however, Will announced that he was going to remix the tracks for inclusion on Black Einstein. In September 2011, a fourth cut from the album, "Forever", a collaboration with Wolfgang Gartner, was released as a single. It was around this time that will.i.am announced that he changed the title of the album from Black Einstein to #willpower. The video premiered on August 26, 2011. In November 2011, Will premiered what is intended to be the album's official lead single, "T.H.E. (The Hardest Ever)", a collaboration with Jennifer Lopez and Mick Jagger. Will announced via his Twitter that the video for "T.H.E. (The Hardest Ever)" was filmed in LA, and that before he returned home, he stopped off in Brazil to film the video for the album's second official single, "Great Times". In December 2011, a fifth cut from the album, "Party Like An Animal", a collaboration with Dutch singer Eva Simons and LMFAO, premiered at the HTC Beats Launch party. Will.i.am also announced he has collaborations with Britney Spears, Alicia Keys, Busta Rhymes, Swizz Beatz and a couple others on the album. He also stated there is a possibility Shakira could feature on the album. #willpower is due for release in 2013, and will.i.am later confirmed that Cheryl and Justin Bieber would also appear on #willpower. In mid-October, Britney Spears confirmed on her Twitter account that she had filmed the music video for the single she was featuring in called "Scream & Shout".

He was among the performers at the Diamond Jubilee Concert held outside Buckingham Palace on June 4, 2012.

The first song broadcast from Mars was his new single, "Reach for the Stars". He discussed and listened to it with a live audience at NASA in Pasadena, California after it was returned from the Curiosity rover.

The song "Hall of Fame" by the Script also featured will.i.am. It debuted onto radio on July 23, 2012, and was released for digital download on August 21, 2012. He later featured in Priyanka Chopra's debut single "In My City". It was announced in October 2012 that will.i.am will feature on Kesha's second album Warrior on the track "Crazy Kids". He also co-wrote and co-produced the Dr Luke produced track.

In November 2012, will.i.am released the third single from #willpower which was "Scream & Shout" featuring Britney Spears. It debuted in the top 20 on the Billboard 100, eventually reaching a peak of number 3 and debuting at number 2 on the UK Singles Chart and reaching number one in January 2013 for two weeks. It went number one in many countries 

During an interview with Capital FM, will.i.am confirmed he had collaborated with Justin Bieber for his next release "#thatPOWER" and premiered the single on the same day it was released onto iTunes in the US the same day and debuted on the Billboard 100 at number 42.

In April 2013, will.i.am and Chris Brown's track "Let's Go", also from the #willpower album, became the centre of a copyright controversy, with trance producers Arty and Mat Zo claiming that will.i.am used elements of their 2011 track "Rebound" in his song without permission from the artists or their label. This claim was later backed by Anjunabeats, the record label behind Arty and Mat Zo.

His fourth studio album, #willpower, was re-released in December 2013 featuring several new tracks, including the lead single "Feelin' Myself" featuring Miley Cyrus, French Montana, and Wiz Khalifa.

Britney Spears featured will.i.am on her song "It Should Be Easy" on her eighth studio album Britney Jean, for which he co-wrote and produced several tracks. He was also an executive producer of the project.

On April 4, 2014, will.i.am appeared on Alan Carr: Chatty Man, where he talked about plans to release his own Smartwatch. He revealed that it can be used as a phone, to store music, and use Facebook, Twitter and Instagram. He also showed a preview of a music video for a song called "It's My Birthday". On May 20, 2014, a 90-second snippet was uploaded to SoundCloud. It features American singer-songwriter Cody Wise, is produced by Will and Damien LeRoy and is written by himself, Cody Wise and Keith Harris. It was released on July 6, 2014.

In an interview with Capital FM, will.i.am confirmed that the Black Eyed Peas were getting back together. On April 7, 2016, will.i.am released the single "Boys & Girls" featuring Pia Mia. A week later on April 14, a new remix of "Mona Lisa Smile" featuring Nicole Scherzinger was released.

2017–present: Recent activities
In March 2020, will.i.am collaborated with a group of artists made up of Bono, Jennifer Hudson, and Yoshiki for the song "Sing For Life". The musicians felt motivated by the widespread sense of despair surrounding the COVID-19 pandemic and the attempts by multiple individuals to pursue creative endeavors while facing new social restrictions. The official YouTube description stated that the track aimed to spread "joy" during trying "times like these".

Other ventures

Acting
The Black Eyed Peas, including will.i.am, first started acting in the commercial series "Instant Def" to advertise Snickers. He starred in Madagascar: Escape 2 Africa as the voice of the character Moto Moto. He contributed a number of tracks to the movie's motion picture soundtrack in collaboration with industry heavyweight Hans Zimmer. Will.i.am played John Wraith in his major film debut, X-Men Origins: Wolverine, a prequel to the X-Men film series. He also guest-starred on the CBS drama Joan of Arcadia as God, one of several actors who played this role during the series. He also starred in the 2011 animated film Rio, and 2014's Rio 2, as a rapping red-crested cardinal named Pedro, and like Madagascar: Escape 2 Africa, he contributed his singing voice to the film's soundtrack, along with his fellow co-stars. Will.i.am played a fathering role in The Urbz: Sims In The City, which uses the Black Eyed Peas' songs as its own soundtrack. He briefly played himself in the Tina Fey and Steve Carell comedy film Date Night. He appeared in the 2016 Grammy-nominated documentary film about American DJ and producer Steve Aoki, titled I'll Sleep When I'm Dead.

The Voice UK and Australia
will.i.am was confirmed as a coach on The Voice UK, of this he said, "I'm proud to be doing The Voice UK because the UK was the first place I saw success," he said. "It's the place I'm the most creative outside of home." Cohen added, "I am thrilled that will.i.am has signed up to be a coach on The Voice. He is a huge star who will bring a unique creativity to the show." Talking about the differences between the show and X Factor, "I won't be a judge on X Factor. The Voice is different. You can't even compare the two. One, you have people in the music industry, current and legends, coaching the next generation. The other format you have judges critiquing, giving their opinions on things when they don't really know, other than Randy Jackson on Idol".

In preparation for the role as a coach, he asked advice from friend and ex-The X Factor judge Cheryl Cole. Talking to Capital FM he said, "I reached out to Cheryl for advice on keeping your cool, having a poker face, the importance of sticking with the singers – it's their dream, a lot of the times when you have other performers a part of the show, celebrities tend to want the shine so they hog up time. So my whole thing was that I want to do The Voice, but I don't want to hog up time to where the singers up there are looking like, 'Is this about you guys?'. In March 2012, it was reported that he had turned his "plush" dressing room into a recording studio, and "instead of just listening with his headphones, he has installed some mega bass bins".

On November 26, 2013, will.i.am was announced as a coach for the 2014 series of the Australian version of The Voice along with fellow Voice UK judge Kylie Minogue. He was the winning coach having coached voice winner Anja Nissen in 2014. Neither will.i.am nor Minogue returned for the fourth series in 2015.

He has contributed to The Voice UK since 2012. He also serves as a coach on the UK version of The Voice Kids.

Fashion
Before joining the Black Eyed Peas, will.i.am attended the Fashion Institute of Design & Merchandising in Los Angeles. In 2001, he began designing his own signature clothing line, i.am, which made its official debut in 2005 at the Magic Apparel Trade Show in Las Vegas. In 2007, will.i.am teamed up with Blue Holdings to design a premium denim collection, i.am Antik, that was scheduled to debut in August 2007 at the Project Show in Las Vegas. will.i.am instead had new partners and was launching i.am. Will.i.am is currently being sued $2 million for abandoning the project for which, the label states, he was obligated until 2016, but will.i.am insists it is already over. He also launched his own glasses range.

Technology

Appearing at the kickoff event for the 2011 FIRST Robotics Competition, Logo Motion held at Southern New Hampshire University, will.i.am stated that he is "a big fan", and that the newly unveiled game was "dope". He also executive produced a TV Special - I.AM. FIRST: Science is Rock & Roll - about the 2011 FIRST World Championship at the Edward Jones Dome, St Louis. It was produced by Greg Sills and Paul Flattery, directed by Michael Dempsey. It was aired by ABC on August 14, 2011, at 7 p.m. As part of the special, will.i.am appeared with the Black Eyed Peas. Willow Smith also performed and will.i.am did a DJ set. He continues to support FIRST, and at the 2013 FIRST World Championship, will.i.am became the first recipient of the Make It Loud award, which is given to the person who has contributed the most in increasing the awareness of FIRST to the general public.

In January 2011, Intel named will.i.am as director of creative innovation, with input in developing smartphones, tablets and laptops.
In January 2012, he appeared on the BBC TV series Top Gear, as the Star in a Reasonably Priced Car, where he claimed he was starting his own car company called IAMAUTO.

By becoming the first artist to stream a song ("Reaching for the Stars") from the surface of Mars on August 28, 2012, will.i.am made inter-planetary music history. The event took place at NASA's Jet Propulsion Laboratory (JPL) in Pasadena, California.

Expanding his forays into iPhone accessory development, will.i.am announced plans to release a camera enhancer to "dramatically enhance the clarity and definition of iPhone photographs," by effectively making the 8-megapixel sensor into a 14-megapixel one. Termed the i.am+, the device was said to be the first in a series of "digital real estate" for the singer.

In April 2016, it was announced that i.am+ had acquired the Tel Aviv machine-learning technology start-up Sensiya.

3D Systems appointed will.i.am as its chief creative officer (CCO) on January 8, 2014.

Since retiring from music (a retirement that did not last), he has helped design smartwatches for German company Deutsche Telekom since late 2015.

In 2016, The Verge reported that will.i.am would join actress Gwyneth Paltrow and serial entrepreneur Gary Vaynerchuk on Apple TV's Planet of the Apps, calling the trio "successful" and "big names" with experience launching companies. The show received mixed to negative reviews.

On July 27, 2017, i.am acquired Wink, the Internet of Things and Smart Home hub platform, from owner Flextronics for a reported $38.7 million with an additional $20 million commitment, likely earmarked to sustain manufacturing of Wink's products.

Personal life
In December 2010, will.i.am discussed suffering from tinnitus as a result of his career. In April 2013, he revealed that he has ADHD. He became a vegan in early 2017.

The i.am Angel Foundation provided fast internet access to the Estrada Courts housing project in Boyle Heights where he formerly lived.

Legal issues
On June 22, 2009, gossip blogger Perez Hilton accused will.i.am and his entourage of assaulting him in Toronto after the MuchMusic Video Awards, a charge will.i.am denied in a video posted on his blog. No further action was taken.

In late 2019, will.i.am's technology company i.am+ was the subject of multiple tax liens, with the state of California alleging over $500,000 in delinquent taxes and the federal government alleging $1.78 million in delinquent taxes and interest.

Discography

Studio albums
 Lost Change (2001)
 Must B 21 (2003)
 Songs About Girls (2007)
 #willpower (2013)

Filmography

Film

Television

Video games

Tours
The #Willpower Tour (2013–15)
The Vans Warped Tour (2009)

Awards and nominations
Daytime Emmy Awards
2008, New Approaches in Daytime Entertainment: "Yes We Can"

Grammy Awards

|-
|rowspan=3|2004
|Elephunk
|Best Engineered Album, Non-Classical
|
|-
|rowspan=2|"Where Is the Love?"  (ft. Justin Timberlake) 
|Best Rap/Sung Collaboration
|
|-
|rowspan=2|Record of the Year
|
|-
|rowspan=4|2005
|rowspan=3|"Let's Get It Started"
|
|-
|Best Rap Performance by a Duo or Group
|
|-
|rowspan=3|Best Rap Song
|
|-
|"Hey Mama"
|
|-
|rowspan=6|2006
|rowspan=2|"Don't Phunk with My Heart"
|
|-
|Best Rap Performance by a Duo or Group
|
|-
|rowspan=2|"Ordinary People"
|Song of the Year
|
|-
|Best R&B Song
|
|-
|"Gone Going"  (with Jack Johnson) 
|Best Pop Collaboration with Vocal
|
|-
|"Don't Lie"
|rowspan=2|Best Pop Performance by a Duo or Group with Vocal
|
|-
|rowspan=4|2007
|"My Humps"
|
|-
|will.i.am
|Producer of the Year, Non-Classical
|
|-
|"Mas Que Nada"
|rowspan=3|Best Best Urban/Alternative Performance
|
|-
|"That Heat"
|
|-
|rowspan=3|2009
|"Be OK"
|
|-
|"American Boy"
|Song of the Year
|
|-
|will.i.am
|Producer of the Year, Non-Classical
|
|-
|rowspan=6|2010
|rowspan=2|The E.N.D.
|Album of the Year
|
|-
|Best Pop Vocal Album
|
|-
|rowspan=2|"I Gotta Feeling"
|Record of the Year
|
|-
|Best Pop Performance by a Duo or Group with Vocals
|
|-
|rowspan=2|"Boom Boom Pow"
|Best Dance Recording
|
|-
|Best Short Form Music Video
|
|}

Latin Grammy Awards
2006, Best Brazilian Contemporary Pop Album: "Timeless", Sérgio Mendes (producer) 

Television Rack Awards
2012, will.i.am. has won ten Television Rack Awards altogether (five with the Black Eyed Peas and five as a solo artist).

The National Television Awards

|-
|2018 || The Voice UK || TV Judge || 
|}

Mirchi Music Awards
2012, Indie Pop Song of the Year - "In My City" (Nominated)

Notes

References

External links

 – official site

Will.i.am at Beatbuggy

 
1975 births
Living people
20th-century American rappers
21st-century American male actors
21st-century American rappers
21st-century American singers
African-American male actors
African-American male rappers
African-American male singers
African-American male singer-songwriters
African-American record producers
American contemporary R&B singers
American expatriates in Australia
American expatriates in the United Kingdom
American hip hop record producers
American hip hop singers
American male film actors
American male pop singers
American male rappers
American male singers
American male television actors
American male voice actors
American rappers of Jamaican descent
Atlantic Records artists
Black Eyed Peas members
Barely Breaking Even artists
Daytime Emmy Award winners
Domain hacks
Grammy Award winners for rap music
Interscope Records artists
Latin Grammy Award winners
Male actors from California
Male actors from Los Angeles
People from Boyle Heights, Los Angeles
People with attention deficit hyperactivity disorder
Pop rappers
Rappers from Los Angeles
Record producers from California
Recipients of the Presidential Medal of Merit (Philippines)
Ruthless Records artists
Singers from Los Angeles
Singer-songwriters from California